René Charrier (born 23 November 1951 in Innsbruck) is a retired professional French footballer who played goalkeeper.

External links

Profile on French federation official site
Profile

1951 births
Living people
French footballers
France international footballers
Association football goalkeepers
CS Sedan Ardennes players
Olympique de Marseille players
Paris FC players
Ligue 1 players
Ligue 2 players